National Highway 150A (NH 150A) is a National Highway in Indian State of Karnataka.  It is a spur road of National Highway 50. NH-150A traverses the states of Karnataka and Andhra Pradesh in India.

Route 
The northern terminus of NH 105A is a junction with NH 50 near Jevargi. The highway traverses southward through eastern Karnataka, briefly entering Andhra Pradesh before returning, down into southern Karnataka. Its southern terminus is a junction with NH 948 near Chamarajanagar.

Junctions  

  Terminal near Jevargi.
  near Ballari.
  near Molakalmuru.
  near Hiriyur.
  near Huliyar.
  near Kibbanahalli.
  near Belluru Cross.
  near Srirangapatna.
  near Mysuru.
  Terminal near Chamarajanagar.

See also 
 List of National Highways in India by highway number
 List of National Highways in India by state

References

External links 

 NH 150A on OpenStreetMap

National highways in India
National Highways in Karnataka

National Highways in Andhra Pradesh